Asset price inflation is the economic phenomenon whereby the price of assets rise and become inflated. A common reason for higher asset prices is low interest rates. When interest rates are low, investors and savers cannot make easy returns using low-risk methods such as government bonds or savings accounts. To still get a return on their money, investors instead have to buy up other assets such as stocks and real estate, thereby bidding up the price and creating asset price inflation.

When people talk about inflation, they usually refer to ordinary goods and services, which is tracked by the Consumer Price Index (CPI). This index excludes financial assets and capital assets. Inflation of such assets should not be confused with inflation of consumer goods and services, as prices in the two categories are often disconnected.

Examples of typical assets are shares and bonds (and their derivatives), as well as real estate, gold and other capital goods. They can also include alternative investment assets such as fine art, luxury watches, cryptocurrency, and venture capital.

Price inflation and assets inflation
As inflation is generally understood and perceived as the rise in price of 'ordinary' goods and services, and official and central bank policies in most of today’s world have been expressly directed at minimizing 'price inflation', assets inflation has not been the object of much attention or concern. An example of this is the housing market, which concerns almost every individual household, where house prices have over the past 25 years consistently risen by or at least near a two digit percentage, far above that of the Consumer Price Index.

Possible causes
Some political economists believe that assets inflation has been, either by default or by design, the outcome of purposive policies pursued by central banks and political decision-makers to combat and reduce the much more visible price inflation.  This could be for a variety of reasons, some overt, but others more concealed or even disreputable. Some think that it is the consequence of a natural reaction of investors to the danger of shrinking value of practically all important currencies, which, as in 2012 e.g., seems to them highly probable due to the tremendous worldwide growth of the mass of money. Their preference for real goods pushes their price up without any purposive policies from decision-makers.

Possible results
Asset price inflation has often been followed by an asset price crash. This can happen in a sudden and sometimes unexpected fall in the price of a particular asset class. Examples of asset price crashes include Dutch tulips in the 17th century, Japanese metropolitan real estate and stocks in the early 1990s, and internet stocks in 2001. A more recent example is that of the 2007 subprime mortgage financial crisis. However, if the money supply has the potential to induce heavy general inflation (all major currencies in 2011/2012) none of these crashes may happen.

See also 
 Economic bubble
 Inflationism
 Inflation hedge

References

External links
 Newsletter. Robert Blumen. Mises Institute

Inflation
Investment
Economic bubbles
Asset
Pricing